Underwood is a surname of English topographic origin.

History
Deriving from the Old English "under" a preposition meaning "under" or "below", plus "wuda", a wood. The name was originally given to one dwelling at the foot of a wood or literally "below the trees of a forest". The name may also be locational from three places named with these elements i.e., Underwood in Derbyshire, England, Underwood, Nottinghamshire, England. The surname is first recorded in the latter half of the 12th Century (see below). One William Underwude appears in the 1219 Assize Court Rolls of Yorkshire, and a William under the Wode in the 1332 Subsidy Rolls of Staffordshire. From the beginning of the surviving parish registers in 1559 there were Underwoods recorded in Pickering parish, North Yorkshire, England. On 2 January 1634, one Joseph Underwood, aged 23 yrs., embarked from London on the ship "Bonaventure" bound for Virginia. He was one of the earliest recorded name bearers to enter America. No less than seven Coats of Arms were granted to families of this name; a particular namebearer mentioned in the Dictionary of National Biography was one Michael Underwood (1737–1820), who practised in London as a surgeon and as a "male-midwife". The first recorded spelling of the family name is shown to be that of William de Underwode which was dated 1188, in the "Records of Bury St. Edmunds, Suffolk", during the reign of King Henry II, known as "The Builder of Churches", 1154 – 1189.

People

Surname

General
 Adin Ballou Underwood (1828–1888), American general
 Antony Underwood, Australian scientist
 April Underwood, tech investor
 Barbara Underwood (born 1944), American lawyer
 Cecil F. Underwood (1867–1943), British scientific collector
 Cecilia Underwood, 1st Duchess of Inverness (c. 1785 – 1873), British peer
 Edmund Underwood (182?–1863), U.S. Army officer 1848–1863
 Edmund Beardsley Underwood (1853–1928), American naval officer, son of Edmund Underwood
 Elizabeth Underwood (c. 1794 – 1858), Australian land owner
 Eric Underwood (1905–1980), Australian scientist
 Francis Henry Underwood (1825–1894), American biographer and diplomat
 George V. Underwood Jr. (1913–1984), American army general
 Gordon Waite Underwood (1932–1978), American naval officer
 Grant Underwood (born 1954), American Mormon historian
 Horace Grant Underwood (1859–1916), American missionary and founder of Yonsei University in Korea
 James Underwood (1771–1844) Australian merchant
 James Underwood (born 1942), British pathologist
 Jim Underwood, American management professor
 John Underwood (PR adviser), British public relation adviser
 John Thomas Underwood (1857–1937), founder of the Underwood Typewriter Company
 Joseph Edwin Underwood (1882–1960), Canadian engineer
 Julie K. Underwood, American academic
 Kevin Ray Underwood (born 1979), American convicted murderer
 Lucien Marcus Underwood (1853–1907), American botanist and mycologist
 Naomi Tacuyen Underwood, Filipina-American journalist and AAPI activist
 Peter Underwood (1937–2014), Australian judge and government official
 Peter Underwood (parapsychologist) (1923–2014), English author, broadcaster and paranormalist
 Robert C. Underwood (1915–1988), American jurist from Illinois
 Rory Underwood (born 1992), Company Director of Rormat ltd
 William D. Underwood, American university president

Arts
 Blair Underwood (born 1964), American actor
 Brittany Underwood (born 1988), American actress
 Carrie Underwood (born 1983), American singer and winner of the American Idol TV series in 2005
 Charles Underwood (1791–1883), English architect 
 Edna W. Underwood (1873–1961), American author, poet, and translator
 Frank Underwood (English musician)
 Franklin Underwood, American musical theatre composer
 George Allen Underwood (1793–1829), English architect
 Gilbert Stanley Underwood (1890–1960), American architect
 Henry Underwood (architect) (1787–1868), English architect
 Henry Jones Underwood (1804–1852), English architect
 Ian Underwood (born 1939), musician
 Jay Underwood (born 1968), American actor
 Katie Underwood (born 1975), Australian singer-songwriter
 Larry Underwood (born 1966), American actor
 Lee Underwood (born 1938), American musician
 Leon Underwood (1890–1975), British artist
 Loyal Underwood (1893–1966), American actor
 Matt Underwood (born 1968), American sports announcer
 Michael Underwood (born 1975), British television presenter
 Mick Underwood (born 1975), British drummer
 Ron Underwood (born 1953), American film director
 Ron Underwood (musician)
 Ruth Underwood (born 1946), American musician
 Sam Underwood (born 1987), American actor
 Sam Underwood (born 1990), British writer, director and actor
 Sara Jean Underwood (born 1984), American model, actress, and Playboy Playmate
 Sheryl Underwood (born 1963), American comedian
 Wilbur Underwood (1874–1935), American poet
 William Lyman Underwood (1864–1929), American photographer

Politicians
 Cecil H. Underwood (1922–2008), American politician
 Henry Underwood (1863–1945), Australian politician
 Jim Underwood (politician), American politician
 John C. Underwood (1840–1913), American politician and judge
 John Curtiss Underwood (1809–1873), American abolitionist, politician and judge
 John W. H. Underwood (1816–1888), American politician
 Joseph R. Underwood (1791–1876), American politician
 Lauren Underwood (born 1986), American politician
 Mell G. Underwood (1892–1972), American politician
 Nerissa Bretania Underwood, Guamanian politician
 Oscar Underwood (1862–1929), American politician
 Robert A. Underwood (born 1948), American politician from Guam
 Thomas Underwood (1863–1948), Canadian politician
 Thomas R. Underwood (1898–1956), American politician
 Warner Underwood (1808–1872), American politician

Sports
 Brad Underwood Basketball coach at the University of Illinois at Urbana–Champaign
 Derek Underwood (born 1945), English cricketer
 Dimitrius Underwood (born 1977), American football defensive end
 Duane Underwood Jr. (born 1994), American baseball player
 E. J. Underwood (born 1983), American football cornerback
 Fred Underwood (1868–1906), American baseball pitcher
 George Underwood (athlete) (1884–1943), American track and field athlete
 Lake Underwood (born 1926), American race car driver
 Marviel Underwood (born 1982), American football safety
 Olen Underwood (born 1942), American football player and judge
 Paul Underwood (born 1973), English footballer
 Rory Underwood (born 1963), English rugby union player
 Tiquan Underwood (born 1987), American football wide receiver
 Tom Underwood (born 1953), American baseball pitcher
 Tony Underwood (born 1969), English rugby union player
 Wayne Underwood (1913–1967), American football player

Fictional characters
 Frank Underwood (House of Cards), fictional American politician
 Grover Underwood, a fictional satyr
 Weevil Underwood, a Yu-Gi-Oh! character
 Braxton Bragg Underwood, the Maycomb newspaper editor in the novel To Kill a Mockingbird by Harper Lee
 Jean Underwood, a teacher in the novel Rage by Stephen King
 Mr. Underwood, a side-character in TimeSplitters 2 and TimeSplitters: Future Perfect

References

See also
 Frank Underwood (disambiguation)
 Justice Underwood (disambiguation)

English-language surnames
English toponymic surnames